This is a list of notable Marathi people an ethnolinguistic group that speaks Marathi, an Indo-Aryan language as their native language.

Rulers and generals

The ancient Maharashtrian kingdoms

 The Jadhav (Sindkhed Raja-Maharashtra)

The Bhosales (Maharashtra)

The Peshwe

The Bhosales (Thanjavur-Tamil Nadu)

The Holkars (Indore-Madhya Pradesh)

The Shinde/Scindia (Gwalior-Madhya Pradesh)

The Newalkars (Jhansi-Uttar Pradesh)

Gangadhar Rao Newalkar
 Lakshmibai

 The Gandekars (Bhor-Maharashtra)

The Pawar (Dhar-Madhya Pradesh)

The Ghorpade (Sandur-Karnataka)

The Gaekwad (Baroda-Gujarat)

Historic warriors

Satvahana dynasty (2nd century BCE–Early 3rd century CE)

Abhira dynasty (Early 3rd century CE-Late 4th century CE)

Traikutaka dynasty (4th century CE)

Vakataka dynasty (Mid 3rd century CE-Early 6th century)

Shilahara dynasty of North Konkan (Early 9th century CE-Mid 13th century CE)

Yadava dynasty (Mid 9th century CE-Early 14th century CE)

During 17th century and Shivaji's reign

During 18th century and Peshwa rule

The 27-year war - India's longest fought war (1680–1707)

Leaders of Anglo Maratha Wars I, II, III (1775–1818)

Indian independence movement

 

Leaders of Ist War of Indian Independence (1857)

Revolutionaries

Father of Indian unrest

Father of Indian armed struggle

First political murder in Indian freedom struggle

First Secret Society for Independence

Others

Humanitarians and reformers

Father of renaissance of western India 

Reformers 

Bene Israeli reformer and scholar

Social activists 

Philanthropists

Defence leaders 
Father of Indian Navy

First living recipient of the Param Vir Chakra

Third woman in the Indian Armed Forces to be promoted to a Three-star rank

ARMY
Generals

Lieutenant Generals

Others

NAVY
Admirals

Vice/Rear Admirals

Others

AIR FORCE
Air Chief Marshal

Air Marshal

Others

Religion and spirituality
Father of Hindu Nationalism in India

Datta Sampradaya

Mahanubhava Sampradaya

Warkari Movement

Ganapatyas

Late medieval period Saints (1200-1526)

Early modern period Saints (1526-1858)

Swadhyaya Movement

Prarthana Samaj

Modern period, independence and after (1858-1947) 

RSS Members

Politics
Speaker of Lok Sabha

First female President of India

Deputy Prime Minister of India

First female Chief Minister of Goa

First female Chief Minister of Rajasthan

First Chief Minister of Goa

First Chief Minister of Uttar Pradesh

First Chief Minister of Bombay State

First Hindu and first man of Indian descent to be elected to the Scottish Parliament

First General Secretary of the Communist Party of India.

Founder of All India Trade Union Congress

Goa's first woman parliamentarian

Samyukta Maharashtra Movement

Union Cabinet Ministers

Others

United Kingdom and Irish politics

American politics

Goa legislative Assembly

 Govind Gaude
 Ramesh Tawadkar
 Subhash Phal Desai
 Sudin Dhavalikar
 Nilkanth Halarnkar

Bureaucrats and diplomats

 
Foreign Service

Indian Administrative Service

Indian Civil Service

Founder, jurists and lawyers 

Father of Indian Constitution

Chief Justice of India
 D. Y. Chandrachud
 P. B. Gajendragadkar
 Y. V. Chandrachud
 V.N. Khare
 Sharad Arvind Bobde
 Uday Umesh Lalit

Supreme Court Judges
 Ajay Manikrao Khanwilkar
 
 P. B. Sawant
 Sudhakar Panditrao Kurdukar
 Hemant Laxman Gokhale
 Bhushan Ramkrishna Gavai
 U. U. Lalit
 Sujata Manohar
 V. D. Tulzapurkar
 J. R. Mudholkar
 Hemant Gokhale

International lawyers 
 Harish Salve
 M. R. Jayakar
 Sakharam Ganesh Pandit

Others
 Moropant Vishvanath Joshi
 G. S. Khaparde
 Prabodh Dinkarrao Desai
 J. R. Mudholkar
 Naresh Harishchandra Patil
 Ujjwal Nikam
 S. B. Tambe
 V. S. Sirpurkar

Business, trade and industries

Father of Indian Trade Union Movement

Founder of the Asia's first Cooperative sugar factory.

Others

Fiscal policy leaders

First Indian to be appointed the Governor of the Reserve Bank of India.
  
RBI Governors

Economists

Academicians/educationists

Ancient Maharashtrian academicians

Founder of India's First Women University

Founder of Indian Sociology & Sociology in India

Founder and president of the Symbiosis Society

Founding director of the Indian Institute of Technology Kanpur

 Founder of Fergusson College

First female teacher of India

First female Indian anthropologist

Most qualified person of India

Pioneers in women's education

Founder of Balwadi

 Tarabai Modak

Indologists

Global Teacher Prize recipient

Father of Marathi journalism.

Others

Sciences

Chemistry

Earth sciences
First Indian Women to Antarctica

Seed Mother of India 

Father of the Indian Seed Industry

Others

Engineering and technology 
Father of Indian Super Computers

First U.S. Chief Data Scientist

Others

Mathematics and statistics
First Indian to be Senior Wrangler

Others

Medicine and surgery 
First Indian Female Physician

First Indian Female to receive PhD

Father of Pathology and Medical Research

ICMR Scientists

Immunologist

Others

Physics
Astronomy

Nuclear scientists

Fellow of Royal Society

Theoretical physicists

Astro - physicists

ISRO and DRDO scientists

Indian Institute Of Technology(IIT) - Chairman/Directors

Aerospace engineering

Others

Industrial design

 Satyendra Pakhale
 Sumant Moolgaokar

Arts

Cinema and theatre
Father of Indian Cinema 

First Indian to receive the Oscar 

First female actress of India 

Dada Saheb Phalke Award - Lifetime contribution to Indian Cinema

 Actors

 Actresses

Directors

Models and beauty pageant winners

Hollywood

Bigg-Boss (Hindi) show winners

Shilpa Shinde
Tejasswi Prakash

Literature

Ancient Maharashtrian litterateurs 

Jnanpith Award winners - Outstanding contribution in Indian Literature

Noted Marathi writers in non-Marathi languages  

D. R. Bendre - Considered as the greatest Kannada lyric poet of the 20th century.
Gajanan Madhav Muktibodh - One of the pioneers of modern Hindi poetry.
Kaloji Narayana Rao- One of the greatest Telugu poets. His birth anniversary is celebrated as Telangana Language Day

Others

Columnists and journalists

Historians

Other applied arts 

Father of Indian Circus - Vishnupant Moreshwar Chatre

First Ventriloquist in Modern India - Y. K. Padhye

Father of Indian Comic Books - Anant Pai

Photographers/cinematographers

Costume/fashion designers

Production designers

Cartoonists

Sculptors

Painters

Calligraphers/typographers

Music

Hindustani classical music

Music directors

Modern music

Singers 

 Winner of Indian Idol (Season 1)

Sports

First Individual Olympic Medal for India

First Individual Paralympic Medal for India

First Indian to score 100 international 100's

First Indian woman to cross Gobi Desert

 First Indian woman to obtain WIM title

 India's first Olympic Marathon runner

Cricket

Chess

Others

Outside Maharashtra
Bene Israel 

Thanjavur 

Uttarakhand 

United Kingdom, Ireland and Europe

Mexico

South East and Far East

Canada

Australia

United States

UAE

Awardee 
First Indian to receive Magsaysay Award (Asia's Nobel) 

Ramon Magsaysay - Asia's Noble

Bharat Ratna - Highest Civilian Award

Ashok Chakra - India's highest peacetime military decoration award for valour, courageous action or self-sacrifice away from the battlefield.

 Hemant Karkare
 Vijay Salaskar
 Ashok Kamte
 Tukaram Omble
 Jagannath Raoji Chitnis
 Vijay Salaskar

Param Vir Chakra -  India's highest military decoration, awarded for displaying distinguished acts of valour during wartime.

 Rama Raghoba Rane
 Ardeshir Tarapore

Victoria Cross

 Yeshwant Ghadge
 Namdeo Jadhav

Padma Vibhushan- Second Highest Civilian Award of India

Balasaheb Gangadhar Kher
Hari Vinayak Pataskar
Kaka Kalelkar
Dattatraya Shridhar Joshi
P. B. Gajendragadkar
C. D. Deshmukh
Premlila Vithaldas Thackersey
Baba Amte
Lakshman Shastri Joshi
Pandurang Shastri Athavale
Nanaji Deshmukh
Lata Mangeshkar
Kishori Amonkar
Jayant Narlikar
Nirmala Deshpande
V. N. Khare
Asha Bhosle
Sachin Tendulkar
Anil Kakodkar
Vijay Kelkar
Raghunath Anant Mashelkar
Sharad Pawar
Balwant Moreshwar Purandare
Prabha Atre
M. F. Husain
Arun Shridhar Vaidya
Vasudev Kalkunte Aatre
Rajinikanth
Madhav Shrihari Aney
Kaloji Narayana Rao

Shanti Swarup Bhatnagar Prize

Prafullachandra Vishnu Sane
Madhav Gadgil
Jayant B. Udgaonkar
Dinakar Mashnu Salunke
Shekhar C. Mande
Sanjeev Galande
Shubha Tole
Rajesh Sudhir Gokhale
Raghavendra Gadagkar
Bal Dattatreya Tilak
Shridhar Ramachandra Gadre
Girjesh Govil
Pramod Sadasheo Moharir
Janardan Ganpatrao Negi 
Shridhar Ramachandra Gadre
Ashwin Gumaste
Amol Arvindrao Kulkarni
Yogesh M. Joshi
Ashish Kishore Lele
Vivek Ranade
Vivek Borkar
Jyeshtharaj Joshi
B. D. Kulkarni
Suhas Pandurang Sukhatme
Raghunath Anant Mashelkar
Kapil Hari Paranjape
Rajeeva Laxman Karandikar
Eknath Prabhakar Ghate
Jayant Vishnu Narlikar
Ramanath Cowsik
Varun Sahni
Atish Dabholkar
Umesh Waghmare
Nissim Kanekar
Mandar Madhukar Deshmukh
Chetan Eknath Chitnis
Santosh G. Honavar
Vidita Ashok Vaidya

Criminals and Gangsters 
Arun Gawli, Indian gangster turned politician 
Dawood Ibrahim Kaskar, Indian crime lord and terrorist who was founder of D-company.
Shabir Ibrahim Kaskar, Indian gangster 
Rajendra Sadashiv Nikalje (often known as Chota Rajan), Indian gangster 
Maya Dolas, Indian gangster and former member of D-company
Manya Surve, Indian gangster 
Dilip Buwa, Indian gangster and sharpshooter 
Ravi Pujari, Indian gangster and extortionist
Chota Shakeel, Indian gangster and lieutenant of Dawood Ibrahim.

See also 
 List of people from Maharashtra
 List of people from Nagpur

References

Marathi people
Lists of people by ethnicity